Paulo Roberto Barros Braga (born Nilópolis, 14 May 1962) is a Brazilian carnavalesco, or carnival planner. He is two-time winner of the samba school title at the Rio Carnival, and has also trained circus artists and army soldiers as performers. He has been compared to Fernando Pinto (pt) and Arlindo Rodrigues.

References

Living people
1962 births